Carl Abel (25 November 1837 – 26 November 1906) was a German comparative philologist from Berlin who wrote Linguistic Essays in 1880. Abel also acted as Ilchester lecturer on comparative lexicography at the University of Oxford and as the Berlin correspondent of the Times and the Standard. His 400-page dictionary of Egyptian-Semitic-Indo-European roots appeared in 1886.  His essay "On the antithetical meanings of primal words" (Ueber den Gegensinn der Urworte) was discussed by Sigmund Freud in an identically titled piece, which, in turn, was discussed by Jacques Derrida as a precursor to deconstruction's semantic insights. He also translated some of Shakespeare's works into German.

He was a son of a successful banker Gerson Abel. Of Jewish descent, he converted to Christianity.

Abel died in Wiesbaden. His son Curt Abel-Musgrave (1860–1938) was a writer and translator. His grandson was noted economist Richard Musgrave.

Work
Über einige Grundzüge der lateinischen Wortstellung. Zweite Auflage. Dümmler, Berlin 1871. Digitalized
Über den Begriff der Liebe in einigen alten und neuen Sprachen. C. G. Lüderitz’sche Publishing house and bookstore Carl Habel, Berlin 1872.
Koptische Untersuchungen. Dümmler, Berlin 1876. Reprinted: Sändig Reprint, Niederwalluf near Wiesbaden 1970.
Slavic and Latin. Ilchester Lectures on comparative lexicography. Oxford University, Oxford 1883 (Digitalized).
Über den Gegensinn der Urworte. Wilhelm Friedrich, Leipzig 1884 (Digitalized).
Sprachwissenschaftliche Abhandlungen. Publishing house Wilhelm Friedrich, Leipzig 1885 (Digitalized).
Einleitung in ein aegyptisch-semitisch-indoeuropaeisches Wurzelwörterbuch. Publishing house Wilhelm Friedrich, Leipzig 1886 (Digitalized). Reprinted: M. Sändig, Wiesbaden 1969.

Notes

References

http://www.pep-web.org/document.php?id=se.011.0153a

1837 births
1906 deaths
Academics of the University of Oxford
German philologists
19th-century German Jews
People from the Province of Brandenburg
Translators of William Shakespeare
Writers from Berlin
19th-century German dramatists and playwrights
19th-century German male writers
19th-century German writers
German male dramatists and playwrights
German male poets
Paleolinguists
Linguists of Indo-Semitic languages